Sharon Stewart-Peregoy (born June 3, 1953) is an American politician serving as a Democratic member of the Montana House of Representatives. She was first elected to the Montana House of Representatives in 2017, and represents House District 42. From 2009 to 2017, she served in Montana Senate, and represented Senate District 21, which included Crow Agency, Montana. She was a member of the Senate's American Indian Caucus. She received a Bachelor of Arts in elementary education from Montana State University and a Master of Education from City University at Seattle. She actively advocates for the revitalization of the Crow language and culture.

In 2009, Stewart-Peregoy became an adjunct professor at Little Big Horn College as a Crow Studies instructor and advocated for more use of the Crow language as part of the planning committee for a new cultural museum in 2021.

Politics 
Though the legislature's policy is to speak in English only, Stewart-Peregoy chose to be sworn in in the Crow language. She joined the American Indian Caucus, which at the time totaled nine members including Stewart-Peregoy.

In the legislature, Stewart-Peregoy has focused on topics including the disproportionate disappearance and domestic violence rates of Indigenous peoples in Montana.

Stewart-Peregoy has served on the following legislative committee assignments:

Senate:

 2009: Agriculture, Livestock, and Irrigation; Business, Labor, and Economic Affairs; Energy and Telecommunications
 2011: Agriculture, Livestock, and Irrigation (Vice Chair); Business, Labor, and Economic Affairs; Education and Cultural Resources
 2013: Agriculture, Livestock, and Irrigation; Business, Labor, and Economic Affairs; Education and Cultural Resources; Ethics
 2015: Agriculture, Livestock, and Irrigation; Business, Labor, and Economic Affairs; Education and Cultural Resources

House:

 2017: Agriculture, Livestock, and Irrigation; Business, Labor, and Economic Affairs; Education and Cultural Resources
 2019: Business and Labor (Vice Chair); Rules; Energy, Telecommunications, and Federal Relations; Fish, Wildlife, and Parks
 2021: Appropriations; House Rules; General Government

Early career and personal life 
Prior to politics, Stewart-Peregoy worked in kindergarten and elementary education before becoming a research and development specialist for the tribe.

References

1953 births
21st-century American politicians
21st-century American women politicians
City University of Seattle alumni
Living people
Crow people
Democratic Party Montana state senators
Montana State University alumni
Native American state legislators in Montana
Native American women in politics
People from Crow Agency, Montana
Women state legislators in Montana